The Yankee Joe Formation is a geological formation exposed in the Blackjack Mountains, Arizona, US. The age of the formation is between 1474 and 1436 million years, and detrital zircon geochronology of its sediments provides clues for reconstruction the supercontinent, Rodinia.

Description
Detrital zircon geochronology establishes a minimum age for the formation of 1474 ± 13 million years. The overlying Blackjack Formation is intruded by the Ruin Granite, with a radiometric age of 1436 ± 2 million years, thus constraining the age of the Yankee Joe to 1474 to 1436 million years.

The formation was originally assigned to the Hess Canyon Group, in which it overlies the White Ledges Formation and is in turn overlain by the Blackjack Formation. The formation is divided into three informal members. The formation erodes to a slope and is visibly folded.

The formation is interpreted as a nearshore fluvial and tidal deposit. It has been heavily deformed by thrusting that produced ~50% shortening. The formation was deposited in a large basin, the Yankee Joe — Defiance basin, which is contemporaneous with the Picuris basin. Detrital zircon age spectrums and isotope ratios from the formation support a reconstruction of the supercontinent, Rodinia, in which Australia was a source of sediments for southwestern Laurentia.

History of investigation
Michael F. Doe and coinvestigators proposed removing the Yankee Joe and Blackjack into the Yankee Joe Group.

References

Geologic groups of the United States
Stratigraphy of Arizona
Precambrian United States